The Atacama Experience is an album by French violinist Jean-Luc Ponty that was  released in 2007. It reached number 24 on the Billboard Top Jazz Albums chart, Ponty's first charting album since Live at Chene Park in 1996. It is his first studio album in six years since Life Enigma. The album personnel consists of Ponty's regular touring band with guest appearances by guitarists Allan Holdsworth (on track 4) and Philip Catherine (on tracks 2, 5 and 12). The title refers to the Atacama Desert on the Pacific coast of Chile. In the first edition of the album the name "Acatama" was used by mistake.

Critical reception 

Critical reception for The Atacama Experience was generally favorable. Michael G. Nastos states in his Allmusic review, "Considering Ponty's most recent work...this recording is not only a welcome change of pace, but a return to the great music that made Ponty an important figure in contemporary music. This one is recommended with no hesitation, and is the brilliant violinist's best effort in nearly 30 years." In his All About Jazz review, John Kelman called it "...a welcome return to form. Thoroughly engaging, it possesses the enduring compositional depth and unmistakable solo acumen that's kept Ponty's name alive, even during years when he's been away from the public eye."

Track listing 
All songs by Jean-Luc Ponty unless otherwise noted.
 "Intro" – 0:15
 "Parisian Thoroughfare" (Bud Powell) – 4:39
 "Premonition" – 3:43
 "Point of No Return" – 6:45
 "Back in the 60's" – 4:03
 "Without Regrets" – 4:29
 "Celtic Steps" – 5:52
 "Desert Crossing" – 3:03
 "Last Memories of Her" – 5:21
 "The Atacama Experience" – 2:01
 "On My Way to Bombay" – 4:32
 "Still in Love" – 5:07
 "Euphoria" (William Lecomte) – 4:49
 "To and Fro" – 4:21

Personnel 
 Jean-Luc Ponty – violin, keyboards, synthesizer, effects
 William Lecomte – piano, keyboards
 Philip Catherine – guitar (tracks 2, 5 and 12)
 Allan Holdsworth – guitar (track 4)
 Guy N'Sangue – bass guitar
 Thierry Arpino – drums
 Taffa Cissé – percussion

Production
 Jean-Luc Ponty – producer, engineer
 Greg Calbi – mastering
 Karim Sai – engineer, mixing
 David Wilkes – A&R
 Claudia Ponty – cover photo
 Kimberly Wright – photography
 Frederic Houis – photography
 Jacky Lepage – photography

References 

2007 albums
Jean-Luc Ponty albums